The  1996 Skoda Czech Open was a men's tennis tournament played on clay in Prague, Czech Republic that was part of the International Series of the 1996 ATP Tour.
Bohdan Ulihrach was the defending champion but lost in the final 7–5, 1–6, 6–3 against Yevgeny Kafelnikov.

Seeds
A champion seed is indicated in bold text while text in italics indicates the round in which that seed was eliminated.

  Thomas Enqvist (first round)
  Yevgeny Kafelnikov (champion)
 n/a
  Marc Rosset (first round)
  Bohdan Ulihrach (final)
  Daniel Vacek (quarterfinals)
  Filip Dewulf (first round)
  Javier Sánchez (quarterfinals)

Draw

External links
 1996 Skoda Czech Open draw

Prague Open (1987–1999)
1996 ATP Tour